Copperfield is a neighborhood in southwestern Lexington, Kentucky, United States. Its boundaries are the Jessamine County line to the south, Clays Mill Road to the east, Twain Ridge Road to the north, and Calevares Drive to the west.

Neighborhood statistics

 Area: 
 Population: 426
 Population density: 2,042 people per square mile
 Median household income (2010): $82,714

References

Neighborhoods in Lexington, Kentucky